Udny railway station was a railway station located in Udny, Aberdeenshire.

History
The station was opened on 18 July 1861 by the Formartine and Buchan Railway. On the southbound platform was the station building and on the east side was the goods yard, which also had a goods shed. There were two signal boxes, one to the north and one to the south. They both opened in 1890 but the north box closed in 1901 with the control going to the south box. The station closed on 4 October 1965.

References

Sources
 
 
 
 RAILSCOT on Formartine and Buchan Railway

Disused railway stations in Aberdeenshire
Railway stations in Great Britain opened in 1861
Railway stations in Great Britain closed in 1965
Beeching closures in Scotland
Former Great North of Scotland Railway stations
1861 establishments in Scotland
1965 disestablishments in Scotland